7440 Závist, provisional designation , is a stony asteroid from the middle region of the asteroid belt, approximately 5 kilometers in diameter. It was discovered on 1 March 1995, by Czech astronomer Miloš Tichý at Kleť Observatory in South Bohemia. The asteroid was named for the Celtic Oppidum Závist.

Orbit and classification 

Závist orbits the Sun in the central main-belt at a distance of 2.2–3.0 AU once every 4 years and 2 months (1,520 days). Its orbit has an eccentricity of 0.17 and an inclination of 11° with respect to the ecliptic. The first precovery was taken at Palomar Observatory in 1980, extending the asteroid's observation arc by 15 years prior to its discovery.

Physical characteristics

Rotation period 

A rotational lightcurve was obtained from photometric observations made at the U.S. Palomar Transient Factory in September 2010. It gave a rotation period of  hours with a brightness amplitude of 0.55 in magnitude.

Diameter and albedo 

The Collaborative Asteroid Lightcurve Link assumes a standard albedo for stony asteroids of 0.20 and calculates a nearly identical diameter of 5.07 kilometers with an absolute magnitude of 13.84.

Naming 

This minor planet was named for the Oppidum Závist (Oppidum Závist), a Celtic settlement south of Prague in Bohemia.

The ancient ruins are located on a hill above Vltava river (also see the minor planets 2367 Praha and 2123 Vltava). The site consists of two parts named "Hradiště" and "Šance". The settlement existed between the 6th century BC and 1st century AD, and represents part of the most outstanding remnants of known Celtic history in the Czech Republic, especially its ramparts and moats, as well as its acropolis. The official naming citation was published by the Minor Planet Center on 4 May 1999.

References

External links 
 Asteroid Lightcurve Database (LCDB), query form (info )
 Dictionary of Minor Planet Names, Google books
 Asteroids and comets rotation curves, CdR – Observatoire de Genève, Raoul Behrend
 Discovery Circumstances: Numbered Minor Planets (5001)-(10000) – Minor Planet Center
 
 

 

007440
Discoveries by Miloš Tichý
Named minor planets
19950301